Valentyn Grekov (born April 18, 1976) is a Ukrainian judoka.

Achievements

External links
 
 

1976 births
Living people
Ukrainian male judoka
Judoka at the 2004 Summer Olympics
Judoka at the 2008 Summer Olympics
Olympic judoka of Ukraine
Competitors at the 2001 Summer Universiade
20th-century Ukrainian people
21st-century Ukrainian people